Kevin Downes is an American actor, writer, producer, director, and co-founder and Chief of Production and Distribution of Kingdom Story Company. Downes grew up in Visalia, five hours north of Los Angeles. Many of the Christian films he participated in were shot there.

Life and career
He has over 15 years' writing, directing, acting and producing experience, much of it in the faith-based market. His vision is to produce high quality motion pictures to share strong messages of hope, faith and love that come through a personal relationship with God through Jesus Christ. The film Mercy Streets which he produced was nominated for the Best Family Film Award.

Kevin lives in Visalia, California with his wife Catherine and dog Darby.
Kevin Downes is the younger brother of producer Bobby Downes who is the founder and CEO of ChristianCinema.com. In 2003, Kevin wrote, produced, directed and starred in Six: The Mark Unleashed opposite Stephen Baldwin, Eric Roberts, David A. R. White and Jeffrey Dean Morgan. The film was released wide in June 2004. 

In 2011, Kevin starred in the film Courageous, directed by Alex Kendrick.

In 2018, he started Kingdom Story Company along with the Erwin Brothers.

Filmography

Actor

Producer

Writer

Director

References

External links
"Six: The Mark Unleashed" Official Site
Downes Brothers Entertainment

Living people
20th-century American male actors
21st-century American male actors
20th-century American screenwriters
21st-century American screenwriters
American male film actors
American male screenwriters
American Christians
People from Visalia, California
Male actors from California
Screenwriters from California
Film producers from California
Film directors from California
Year of birth missing (living people)